Sachché Ká Bol-Bálá is an Indian film from 1989, produced, directed and starred by Dev Anand, along with Jackie Shroff, Meenakshi Sheshadri and a special guest appearance by Hema Malini.

Plot
Karan Kaul (Dev Anand) is the Editor of a daily newspaper called "The Truth". He is respected by his fans and critics alike. He loves Greeta Saunders (Hema Malini), a Swiss national of Indian origin. Then Karan himself becomes a suspect, and faces loss of credibility, when he is accused of killing Greeta, after the police find evidence linking his footprints at the scene of crime.

Cast
Dev Anand as Editor Karan Kaul
Hema Malini as Geeta/Greeta Saunders
Jackie Shroff as Nandi
Meenakshi Sheshadri as Reema
Prem Chopra as Nandkishore Bata
Gulshan Grover as Talwar
Dalip Tahil as Jill
Sadashiv Amrapurkar as Inspector Nadkarni
Satish Shah as Akram

Music
Lyrics: Amit Khanna

External links

1989 films
1980s Hindi-language films
Films directed by Dev Anand
Films scored by Bappi Lahiri